Lane's Island is an island which is part of the town of Vinalhaven in Knox County, Maine. It is approximately 45 acres in size and connected by causeway to mainland Vinalhaven. About 2/3 of the island is protected by a nature preserve. It is named after Captain Timothy Lane, an early European settler of the island.

References

Islands of Knox County, Maine
Protected areas of Knox County, Maine
Islands of Maine
Coastal islands of Maine
Vinalhaven, Maine